The 1905 West Virginia Mountaineers football team was an American football that represented West Virginia University as an independent during the 1905 college football season. In its first season under head coach Carl Forkum, the team compiled a 6–3 record and outscored opponents by a total of 172 to 44. Paul H. Martin was the team captain.

Schedule

References

West Virginia
West Virginia Mountaineers football seasons
West Virginia Mountaineers football